L'Or Lemba-Mbongo (née L'Or Mbongo,  L'Or Mbongo-Lemba) is a Congolese singer–songwriter and cantor living in Kinshasa. She had made 7 albums during the course from 2003 to 2019.

Early life 
L'Or Mbongo was born in the Matété commune of then Zaire, Kinshasa on 6 July 1978. Some sources state that L'Or Mbongo was born in Matadi or Kisenso, but she originally came from Matété. She had said multiple times during interviews that her early life was hard and tough. She lived with her stepmother who was housed in a shack and was treated worse than the rest of her brother and sisters.  This would help her late compose many songs, including her debut album.

Career 
After graduating the Lycée Sainte Germaine de N'djili in the Commercial and Administration in 1997, L'Or Mbongo went to enroll at the University of Kinshasa. Her studies were stopped due to financial problems. 2 years later, in 1999, L'Or Mbongo met Christian Lemba while she was singing in the church choir. She was among the singers of her school to enhance cultural and other events. Christian Lemba was the keyboard player of the group. They were in a relationship and got married in 1999/2000.

They both had maintained their relationship with God and composed many songs through the years. Over time, L'Or had looked up to many other singers, including Lili Sumbela, Denis Ngonde, Kanguma, and the Gaël music group. Before joining her husband's band, L'Or Mbongo had to pray to make sure she can go and do music. According to her, it took a sign from God to realize that she could definitely go into music without any fear.

After she realized, L'Or Mbongo joined her husband's Christian gospel band, La Mano Di Dio. The group helped make L'Or Mbongo's presence known in nowadays Democratic Republic of the Congo. This also helped L'Or make her first album, Tina Te Eza Na Tina which literally means "Something without value has value". She made her first live album a year later when she released Live O2 Brixton Academy while on tour in London.

L'Or Mbongo soon released 5 more albums from 2003 to 2010, which included Nsimbulu, Cadeau de Mariage,Yesu Kaka, Oracle de l'Eternal, and Dans ta présence. L'Or Mbongo's most recent album, Ma robe de glorie (which literally means "My dress of glory") was released in 2019. She was also featured and many albums, including Henri Papa Mulaja's Merci Seigneur pour 2020 with Fiston Mbuyi, LORD LOMBO, Jonathan Munghongwa, Patient Munghongwa and Cassi Kalala. L'Or Mbongo was also featured in Junior Kadia's Bonne semence, Vol. 1 in the song Kumisa Yahweh with Sandra Mbuyi, Anny Nsinga, the KUNDA sisters, Moïse Matuta, and Papy Boofe.

Known for being a singer, L'Or Mbongo is also the United Nations Anti-Mine Ambassador for the Democratic Republic of the Congo. She was appointed on 4 April 2009. L'Or Mbongo's main goal was to stop mines across the DRC's soil was littered with detonated explosives from the Second Congo War. When asked about the detonated bombs, L'Or Mbongo said:
The person who contacted us was happy to see that the Ambassador did something. With the plea in any case, God willing, the Bas-Congo will also see us in this context. We will organize the awareness sessions.
L'Or Mbongo had also been helping with charity and people in orphanages. She also is building a health center in Maluku, a commune in Kinshasa.

Personal life 
L'Or Mbongo is a mother of five and married Christian Lemba in 2000.

Discography 
7 albums with her debut album being the "Oracle de l'Eternal" in 2008. She had been featured on multiple occasions.

Albums 
 2003: Tina Te Eza Na Tina
 2004: Nsimbulu
 2006: Cadeau de Mariage
 2007:  Yesu Kaka
 2011: Scusa
 2015: Oracle de l'Eternel
 2019: Ma Robe de Gloire

Live albums 
 2004: Live O2 Brixton Academy (Live at Brixton Academy in London)

Featured in 
 2018: Yesu Elonga na Ngai with Immaculée Omandji
 2018: Bonne semence, Vol. 1 with Junior Kadia
 2019: Bendele with Immortel Kaniki
 2020: Merci Seignguer pour 2020 with Henri Papa Mulaja
 2021: Adorarei with Francisco Doceta

References 

21st-century Democratic Republic of the Congo women singers
1978 births
University of Kinshasa alumni
Gospel musicians
Living people
21st-century Democratic Republic of the Congo people